The FSBI Medal is an international fish biology and/or fisheries science prize awarded annually for exceptional advances by a scientist in the earlier stages of his or her career. Medallists have made a significant contribution to the field of fish biology through their achievements in scientific research. The medal is only awarded if a candidate of sufficient quality is nominated.
The medal was established by the Fisheries Society of the British Isles (FSBI) to recognize distinction in the field of fish biology and fisheries science, and to raise the profile of the discipline and of the Society in the wider scientific community. Medals are awarded to individuals who have made an outstanding contribution to fish biology and/or fisheries. 
The FSBI Medal is traditionally awarded in July at the Fisheries Society of the British Isles Annual International Conference.

Medallists
Source: FSBI
2022 - Amy Deacon
2021 - Christos Ioannou
2020 - Julien Cucherousset
2019 - Shaun Killen
2018 - Aaron McNeil
2017 - Nick Graham
2016 - Stephen Simpson
2015 - Kathryn Elmer
2014 - Darren Croft
2013 - Katherine Sloman
2012 - Robert Arlinghaus
2011 - Ashley Ward
2010 - Iain Barber
2009 - John Pinnegar
2008 - Steven J. Cooke
2007 - David W. Sims
2006 - Victoria Braithwaite
2005 - Jason Link
2004 - Michel Kaiser
2003 - Jens Krause
2002 - Etienne Baras
2001 - Simon Jennings
2000 - John Reynolds 
1999 - Neil Metcalfe

See also

 List of biology awards

References

Fisheries science
Biology awards
British science and technology awards
Awards established in 1999